Vanechka is a 2007 Russian drama film directed by Elena Nikolaeva.

Plot 
Nadya came to Moscow to enter the theater institute. During the exams, she stayed with her friends. However, they die in a car accident, and Nadya was left alone with their little son Vanechka in her arms.

Cast 
 Yelena Velikanova as Nadya
 Maksim Galkin as Vanechka
 Andrey Panin as Gavrilov
 Evdokiya Germanova as orphanage headmistress
 Sergey Batalov  as Major Nikulenko
 Alisa Grebenshchikova	as 	Zina
 Valery Barinov as taxi driver
 Olga Drozdova as Olga Borisovna (cameo)
 Armen Dzhigarkhanyan as Professor Armen Borisovich (cameo)
 Sergey Yushkevich as Yan
 Ivan Rudakov as young priest

References

External links 
 

2007 films
2000s Russian-language films
Russian drama films
2007 drama films
Films scored by Yuri Poteyenko